Scopula stenoptila is a moth of the family Geometridae. It is found in South Africa.

References

Endemic moths of South Africa
Moths described in 1916
stenoptila
Moths of Africa